The acronym AAEP may refer to:

Advanced Aviation Education Programme, see Hong Kong Air Cadet Corps#Advanced Aviation Education Programme (AAEP) Scholarship
American Academy of Emergency Physicians
Argentine Association of Political Economy
American Association of Equine Practitioners
American Association for Emergency Psychiatry